Aquaculture in East Timor is not a large industry; however, World Vision has expressed an interest in organizing aquaculture development projects in the country in order to help those who suffer food shortages in the upland areas. Research has demonstrated that East Timor has great potential for both fresh- and salt-water aquaculture, including microphyte production.

References

East Timor
Agriculture in East Timor
Water in East Timor